Coactivation may mean:
 Coactivation (Transcription), a process by which RNA transcription is increased
 Muscle coactivation, a phenomenon in which a muscle is activated coordinately with another muscle